Fred Harrison (18 February 1893 – 3 December 1979) was an  Australian rules footballer who played with St Kilda in the Victorian Football League (VFL).

Notes

External links 

1893 births
1979 deaths
Australian rules footballers from Victoria (Australia)
St Kilda Football Club players